The 1964–65 Football League Cup was the fifth season of the Football League Cup, a knockout competition for England's top 92 football clubs; 82 of them competed.  The competition ended with the two-legged final on 15 March and 5 April 1965.

Match dates and results were initially drawn from Soccerbase, and they were later checked against Rothmans Football Yearbook 1970–71.

Calendar
Of the 82 teams, 46 received a bye to the second round and the other 36 played in the first round; these were the teams ranked 57th–92nd in the 1963–64 Football League. Semi-finals and final were two-legged.

First round

Ties

Replays

Second round

Ties

Replays

Third round

Ties

Replays

Fourth round

Ties

Replays

Fifth Round

Ties

Replay

Semi–Finals

First Leg

Second Leg

Final

Chelsea win 3–2 on aggregate.

References

General

Specific

									
									
									

1964–65
1964–65 domestic association football cups
Lea
Cup